Rodolfo Solís Parga (born 17 February 1958) is a Mexican politician from the Labor Party. From 2006 to 2009 he served as Deputy of the LX Legislature of the Mexican Congress representing Guanajuato.

References

1958 births
Living people
People from Chihuahua City
Labor Party (Mexico) politicians
21st-century Mexican politicians
Deputies of the LX Legislature of Mexico
Members of the Chamber of Deputies (Mexico) for Guanajuato